Wittmann is an unincorporated community and census-designated place (CDP) in Maricopa County, Arizona, United States. As of the 2020 census, it had a population of 684, down from 763 in 2010.

A variant name was "Nadaburg"; the present name is for Joseph Wittmann and his wife Eleanor van Beuren Wittmann, a couple who attempted several times to get approvals to build a dam project in nearby Box Canyon that would have benefitted the town. This was to be a successor to the poorly engineered Walnut Grove dam that had collapsed in February 1890, less than two years after it had filled. Eleanor van Beuren's father was the nominal head of a group of East Coast investors that had funded what was then primarily a placer mining project. One of the Walnut Grove Water Storage Company's engineers (not responsible for the design) was Lieutenant Colonel Alexander Oswald Brodie, who was later appointed Arizona's territorial governor.

Governmental approval and adequate funding lacking, the replacement dam project plans faltered. A long-projected time for repayment of supplemental government funding killed Joseph Wittmann's project in the 1940s, leaving promises to Maricopa County families broken.

The naming of nearby Morristown also refers to the Wittmann and van Beuren families, for they had residences in Morristown, New Jersey.

History
The town was first named "Nadaburg", which is a combination of two words, the Spanish word "Nada", which means "nothing" and the German word "burg", which means "town". The Southern Transcontinental Railroad named the site Nadaburg years before the area was formally opened to homesteading as a result of the Department of Interior Act of December 29, 1916.

William Hovey Griffin, a native of Texas, founded the town of Nadaburg (Wittmann). He filed his homestead petition in September 1920. That same year he also plotted out the town site. Griffin donated a block of land to the Maricopa County School District where the little Red School House (it was white at that time) was built. The school currently serves as the Nadaburg Unified School District Governing Board’s Boardroom.

Joseph Wittmann, continuing a legacy initiated by his father-in-law, endeavored to build a dam on the Hassayampa River, which would bring irrigation water to the town of Nadaburg. In 1926, lots and acreage were given to Wittmann, by the citizens of Nadaburg, in support of the construction of the dam. In 1930, the people of Nadaburg changed the name of the town to Wittmann, honoring the family who promised them the water that would irrigate their fields. Other land and claims included those that had belonged to the Wittmann-van Beuren family ever since the Walnut Grove Water Storage Company went into receivership in the 1890s. However, unable and/or ill-equipped to keep his family's promise, Joseph Wittmann and his son Joseph, Jr. were sued by the citizens of the town; at least half of them were able to recover their lands.

Demographics 

As of the census of 2010, there were 763 people living in the Wittmann census-designated place. The population density was 56.3 people per square mile. The racial makeup of Wittmann was 83.8% White, 0.8% Black or African American, 1.2% Native American, 0.5% Asian, 0.1% Pacific Islander, 10.6% from other races, and 3.0% from two or more races. 24.0% of the population were Hispanic or Latino of any race.

Images

See also

 List of census-designated places in Arizona

References

External links

 

Census-designated places in Maricopa County, Arizona